Prince Fereydoun Mirza (born between 1810 and 1812 – 26 December 1855) Persian Prince of Qajar dynasty, was the 5th son of Abbas Mirza, then crown prince of Persia. Upon becoming Vice-Governor of Azerbaijan in 1831, he was bestowed with the title of "Nayeb-ol Ayalah", Prince Governor of Azerbaijan in 1835, and of Fars from 1836 to 1840, in which function he received the title "Farman Farma". He was thus the second holder of this title during the Qajar Rule in Iran. From 1853 to his death he was Prince Governor of Khorasan. In the first year of his governorship of that province, he led at least one campaign against the Turkomans at Ashghabad and had destroyed that town and 36 fortifications around. As poet he is also known under his pen name "Farrok".

He died in Mashhad.

References

 Nava'i, Abdol-hossein (1976). Tarikh-e Azodi.

Qajar princes
1810s births
1855 deaths
19th-century Iranian politicians